Oțelul II Galați was a Romanian professional football club from Galaţi, Galați County, Romania, founded in 2007. It activated as the reserve team of Oţelul Galaţi, a club playing in the top division of Romanian football in that period, Liga I.

The team disbanded in early 2015 due to insufficient funding. Most of the players signed for a local club that's active in the same division, Metalosport.

Honours

Liga III:

Winners (0):
Runners-up (1): 2008–09

Current squad

Notable Managers
Dan Dobai
Ion Basalîc
Constantin Schumacher

References

Defunct football clubs in Romania
Football clubs in Galați County
Association football clubs established in 2007
Liga III clubs
2007 establishments in Romania
Association football clubs disestablished in 2015
2015 disestablishments in Romania